The Sari Soldiers is a 2008 documentary film about the Nepalese Civil War and it is directed by Juile Bridgham.

Reception 
Ronnie Scheib of Variety wrote "One of several recent docus that give credence to the old feminist saw that if women were given power, they would speedily put an end to war". Slant Magazine praised the film writing "Even at its spottiest, however, Bridgham’s overarching portrait of political upheaval is compassionate and insightful, and in courageous Devi’s quest for maternal and social justice, the director discovers a symbol of both inspirational human rights advocacy, and the terrible tragedy of tyranny".

Awards

References

External links
 

2008 films
Nepalese Civil War films
Documentary films about Nepal